Perazzolo is an Italian surname. Notable people with the surname include:

 (born 1984), Italian volleyball player
Mario Perazzolo (1911–2001), Italian footballer

See also
Perazzoli

Italian-language surnames